Eye gunk or eye goop may refer to:

 Rheum of the eye: mucus, tears, dust, etc.
 Makeup for the eyelids, eyelashes, eyebrows: eye shadow, mascara, etc.